Meng Xiangwei (born June 1966) is the Communist Party Secretary of Qinhuangdao, Hebei, China. Meng was born in Zhao County, Hebei. He earned a degree in journalism from Lanzhou University. After graduating, he worked for the North Economic Daily newspaper. He then worked as a political staffer to Hebei party chiefs Cheng Weigao and Ye Liansong, before moving to the Baoding area to take on a series of local leadership roles. In 2013, he became party chief of Xingtai. In 2015, he was named party chief of Qinhuangdao.

References

1966 births
Living people
Political office-holders in Hebei